Jansel Rafael Ramírez Feliz (born September 25, 1983 in Santo Domingo) is an amateur Dominican Republic Greco-Roman wrestler, who competed in the men's featherweight category. Considered one of the Caribbean's top Greco-Roman wrestlers in his decade, Ramirez has claimed two bronze medals in the 55 and 60-kg division at the Pan American Games (2007 and 2011), and also represented the Dominican Republic at the 2004 Summer Olympics. Ramirez is also a member of the wrestling club for the Dominican Republic National Team, under his personal coach and mentor Alexis Camué.

Ramirez qualified as a lone wrestler for the Dominican Republic squad in the men's 55 kg class at the 2004 Summer Olympics in Athens, by receiving a wild card invitation from the International Federation of Associated Wrestling (FILA). He lost two straight matches, one to Japan's Masatoshi Toyota due to the ten–point superiority limit, and the other to Hungarian wrestler and eventual winner István Majoros with a 5–0 decision, leaving Ramirez on the bottom of the pool and placing last out of twenty-two wrestlers in the final standings.

References

External links
 

1983 births
Living people
Dominican Republic male sport wrestlers
Olympic wrestlers of the Dominican Republic
Wrestlers at the 2004 Summer Olympics
Wrestlers at the 2007 Pan American Games
Wrestlers at the 2011 Pan American Games
Sportspeople from Santo Domingo
Pan American Games bronze medalists for the Dominican Republic
Pan American Games medalists in wrestling
Wrestlers at the 2015 Pan American Games
Central American and Caribbean Games silver medalists for the Dominican Republic
Central American and Caribbean Games bronze medalists for the Dominican Republic
Competitors at the 2006 Central American and Caribbean Games
Competitors at the 2010 Central American and Caribbean Games
Central American and Caribbean Games medalists in wrestling
Medalists at the 2007 Pan American Games
Medalists at the 2011 Pan American Games
20th-century Dominican Republic people
21st-century Dominican Republic people